Quincy D. Newell (born 1976) is an American historian of the nineteenth-century American West especially as it involves the religious experiences of racial and ethnic minorities. She is associate professor at Hamilton College, a member of the executive committee of the Mormon History Association, and co-editor of the journal Mormon Studies Review (2019– ) In 2015, Newell presented the 21st Leonard J. Arrington Lecture at the Utah State University: "Narrating Jane: Telling the story of an early African American Mormon woman."

Books
Constructing lives at Mission San Francisco: Native Californians and Hispanic colonists, 1776-1821 (University of New Mexico Press, 2009) 
New perspectives in Mormon studies: Creating and crossing boundaries (Eric F. Mason & Quincy D. Newell, eds.; University of Oklahoma Press, 2013) 
Your sister in the gospel: The life of Jane Manning James, a nineteenth-century black Mormon (Oxford University Press, 2019)

References

External links
 
Interviews
The Mormon Book Review, New Perspectives in Mormon Studies
Dialogue journal: "Q&A with Quincy D. Newell"
From the Desk: "Ten Questions with Quincy Newell" (sponsor – BYU Studies'')
Reviews
JI.org – Quincy Newell's Your Sister in the Gospel" (part one; part two)
Multi-media
2015 Arrington Lecture: Narrating Jane: Telling the Story of an Early African American Mormon Woman" (video)

American educators
Amherst College alumni
Historians of the United States
Historians of the Latter Day Saint movement
Living people
Mormon studies scholars
Hamilton College (New York) faculty
University of North Carolina at Chapel Hill alumni
American women academics
American women historians
Historians of the American West
Historians of African Americans
Historians of Native Americans
Women's historians
1975 births
21st-century American women